Claudio Michelotto (born 31 October 1942) is a former Italian professional cyclist. The highlight of his career came with his victory in the Mountains Classification at the 1969 Giro d'Italia. Michelotto finished second overall in the 1969 Giro, his highest finish ever in the Giro d'Italia. He retired from cycling in 1973.

Major results

1968
 1st  Overall Tirreno–Adriatico
 1st Coppa Agostoni
 3rd Giro del Ticino
 3rd Giro dell'Emilia
1969
 1st  Overall Giro di Sardegna
 1st Trofeo Laigueglia
 1st Milano–Torino
 2nd Overall Giro d'Italia
1st  Mountains classification
1st Stage 21
1971
 1st Giro di Campania
 2nd Genova–Nizza
1972
 1st Stage 4 Tour de Suisse
 2nd Coppa Agostoni

References

1942 births
Living people
Italian male cyclists
Sportspeople from Trento
Tour de Suisse stage winners
Cyclists from Trentino-Alto Adige/Südtirol